Emergency +4 is a 1973–1974 American animated television series based on the live action prime-time series Emergency!

The cartoon features the show's two main characters, young firefighter-paramedics John Roderick "Johnny" Gage and Roy DeSoto, voiced by the actors who played them on the prime-time series, Randolph Mantooth and Kevin Tighe. It also added a "plus four" of young people trained in lifesaving techniques — Carol, Matt, Jason and Randy — along with their pets, Flash the dog, Charlemayne the myna bird and Bananas the monkey.

Broadcast run
The series began on NBC's Saturday morning schedule on September 8, 1973, and ran twenty-three 30-minute episodes over two seasons. The final episode aired on   November 30, 1974. The show remained on the network until September 4, 1976 through re-runs.

Casting
Randolph Mantooth and Kevin Tighe provided the character voices for their respective Emergency! paramedic characters of John Roderick Gage and Roy DeSoto. (See below for other character voice providers.)

Format
Each episode of the adventure series revolved around the Paramedical Rescue Service. The "+4" of the series title referred to the four children who joined the paramedics in each episode's rescue activities.

Production
Universal Studios outsourced the animation to Fred Calvert Productions because, at the time, it did not have its own animation division.

Cast
 Randolph Mantooth as John Gage
 Kevin Tighe as Roy DeSoto
 Donald Fullilove as Jason Phillips
 Peter Haas as Randy Alrich
 Sarah Kennedy as Sally and Carol Harper
 David Jolliffe as Matthew Harper
 Richard Paul (12 episodes, 1974)

Episodes

Season 1 (1973)

Season 2 (1974)

Credits
Season 1
 Produced and Directed by Fred Calvert
 Starring the Voices of Randolph Mantooth and Kevin Tighe, with Donald Fullilove, Peter Haas, David Jolliffe, Sarah Kennedy
 Associate Producer: Clifford Alsberg
 Created by Harold Jack Bloom, R.A. Cinader
 Stories by Joel Kane, Carol Henning, David & Susan Dworski, Peter Dixon, Joe Bonaduce, Norman Maurer, Fred Freiberger, Michael Donovan
 Storyboard Director: Jan Green
 Storyboards: Bill Perez, Joe Bruno, Corny Cole
 Story Editors: Harriet Foster, Janis Fierstein
 Animation Director: Ray Patterson
 Animation: Edwin Aardal, Joan Drake, Daniel De La Vega, Shannon Lee Dyer, Robert Goe, Fred Hellmich, Robert Maxfield, Ambrozi Paliwoda, Morey Reden, Allen Wilzbach
 Production Designer: Don Jurwich
 Layout: Ray Aragon, Dale Barnhart, Kimie Calvert, Norm Gottfredson, Paul Gruwell, Alex Ignatiev, Michael Moss, James Mueller, Michael O'Mara, Norly Paat, Joel Seibel, Tony Sgroi, Craig Spaulding, Grace Stanzell, Al Wilson, Zygamond Jablecki
 Background Stylist: Walt Peregoy
 Background: Daniela Bielecka, Linda Langmade, Carolyn Lim, Cathy Patrick, Don Schweikert, Donald Watson
 Production Coordinator: Paul Shively
 Music by Sound Track Music Company
 Editing: Bill Shippey, Peter Aries
 Ink and Paint Supervisor: Pat Jencks
 Checking Supervisor: Jan Cornell
 Scene Coordinator: Rollie Greenwood
 Xerox Supervisor: Ralph Coffman
 Camera: Animation Camera Services, Inc.
 Sound Engineering: Tom Rees, Valentine Recording
 Production Assistants: Vanessa O'Meara, Carolyn Rosales
 Fred Calvert Productions in association with Mark VII Limited and Universal Studios

Season 2
 Executive Producers: Fred Calvert, Michael Jaffe
 Produced and Directed by Fred Calvert
 Associate Producer: Janis Fierstein
 Created by Harold Jack Bloom, R.A. Cinader
 Starring the Voices of Randolph Mantooth and Kevin Tighe, with Donald Fullilove, Peter Haas, Sarah Kennedy, Bobby Diamond, Richard Paul, Jack DeLeon, Casey Kasem
 Story Editors: Harriet Foster, Janis Fierstein
 Art Director: Kimie Calvert
 Storyboard/Layout: Gerard Baldwin, Gordon Bellamy, Norly Paat, Michael O'Mara, Roy Wilson, Bill Perez
 Animation: Shannon Lee Dyer, Edwin Aardal, Ed DeMattia, Fred Hellmich, Don Schloat, Allen Wilzbach
 Background Stylist: Walt Peregoy
 Background: Daniela Bielecka, Cathy Patrick, Don Schweikert, Donald Watson
 Music by Sound Track Music Company
 Editing: Bill Shippey, Peter Aries
 Production Coordinator: Don Schloat
 Scene Coordinator: Rollie Greenwood
 Ink and Paint Supervisor: Laurie Curran
 Xerox Supervisor: Ralph Coffman
 Camera: Animation Camera Services, Inc.
 Voice Track: Larrabee Sound
 Fred Calvert Productions in association with Mark VII Limited and Universal Studios

References

External links
 
 Episode guide at the Big Cartoon DataBase

1973 American television series debuts
1976 American television series endings
1970s American animated television series
American children's animated adventure television series
American animated television spin-offs
Emergency!
NBC original programming
Television series by Mark VII Limited
Television series by Universal Television